A sour cream doughnut is a type of doughnut that incorporates sour cream into its batter. This type of doughnut is often dipped in a vanilla flavored glaze after frying and usually has no filling. While the exact date or place of origin for the sour cream doughnut is not known, one recipe for this type of doughnut was published by the Ladies' Aid Society of Marion, Ohio in 1894.

Variations
Variations on a traditional sour cream doughnut include using a maple glaze with a sugar-walnut streusel. Another variation is a chocolate sour cream doughnut with a chocolate orange glaze. As a substitute for the traditional vanilla glaze topping, powdered sugar or a ground cinnamon and sugar mixture can also be used.

See also
 List of doughnut varieties
 Old fashioned doughnut

References

External links

American doughnuts
Canadian doughnuts